The Ninth Wave (Dyevyatiy val) is an 1850 painting by Russian-Armenian marine painter Ivan Aivazovsky. It is his best-known work.

The title refers to an old sailing expression referring to a wave of incredible size that comes after a succession of incrementally larger waves.

It depicts a sea after a night storm and people facing death attempting to save themselves by clinging to debris from a wrecked ship. The debris, in the shape of the cross,  appears to be a Christian metaphor for  salvation from the earthly sin. The painting has warm tones, which reduce the sea's apparent menacing overtones and a chance for the people to survive seems plausible. This painting shows both the destructiveness and beauty of nature.

References

External links

The Ninth Wave, 1850 at the Russian State Museum

Paintings by Ivan Aivazovsky
1850 paintings
Maritime paintings
Paintings in Saint Petersburg
Collections of the Russian Museum